Courtice Secondary School is a public high school in the community of Courtice in Clarington, Ontario, Canada, at the corner of Nash and Courtice Roads.

History
It was built in the late 1950s and opened in September 1960. The school has just under 1,000 students and is a part of the Kawartha Pine Ridge District School Board. It has five feeder schools: Courtice North P.S., Lydia Trull P.S., Courtice Intermediate School, Emily Stowe P.S., and S.T. Worden P.S. Courtice Intermediate School is located in the same building as Courtice Secondary. It opened in September 2013 as a response to overcrowding at Dr. G. J. MacGillivray. Grade 7 and 8 students from the Dr. G. J MacGillivray area are now directed to Courtice Intermediate.; the French Immersion program for grades 7 and 8 in the Courtice area has also been moved to Courtice Intermediate.

Beginning in the fall of 2014, Courtice Secondary became home to the French Immersion program for French Immersion students starting grade 9.

Notable alumni
 Brad Beaumont, soccer player
 Allysha Chapman, Olympic soccer player, gold and bronze medal winner
 Evan Esselink, long-distance runner
 Lori Glazier, snowboarder at the 1998 Winter Olympics
 Zach Higgins, lacrosse player
 Derek Keenan, lacrosse player
 Matthew Morison, Olympic snowboarder
 Samantha Munro, actress

School teams and clubs

 Soccer (Boys and Girls)
 Volleyball (Boys and Girls)
 Basketball (Boys and Girls)
 Bowling (Boys and Girls)
 Varsity Boys Baseball
 Tennis (Boys and Girls)
 Hockey (Boys and Girls)
 Boys Lacrosse
 Track and Field
 Cross Country
 Curling (Boys and Girls)
 Rugby (Boys and Girls)
 Varsity Girls Softball
 Wrestling (On Pause)
 Girls Field Hockey 
 School Reach
 Art Club
 Drama Club
 Film Club
 White Pine (started in 2009)
 Yearbook
 Concert, Jazz, Senior and Beginner Band
 AV Club 
 Dungeons and Dragons
 Bible Club
 Girl Talk
 Eco-club

See also
 List of high schools in Ontario

References

External links

 

High schools in the Regional Municipality of Durham
Buildings and structures in Clarington
1960 establishments in Ontario
Educational institutions established in 1960